Now That's What I Call Music! 8 was released on November 20, 2001. The album is the eighth edition of the Now! series in the U.S. It peaked at number two on the Billboard 200 and has been certified 3× Platinum by the RIAA. Three tracks selected for the album, "Bootylicious", "Stutter" and "U Got It Bad", had reached number one on the Billboard Hot 100.

Now! 8 is dedicated to Aaliyah, who had died in a plane crash on August 25, 2001, with a portion of the album's profits going to the Aaliyah Memorial Fund.

Track listing

* The song "I'm Real" by Jennifer Lopez is not the more popular "Murder Remix" version featuring Ja Rule.

Charts

Weekly charts

Year-end charts

References

2001 compilation albums
 008
Virgin Records compilation albums